Shahid Saeed (Urdu: شاہد سعید) (born 6 January 1966) is a former Pakistani cricketer who played in one Test match and 10 One Day Internationals from 1989 to 1993. He is one of four cricketers who debuted in the same match along with the legendary Sachin Tendulkar and Waqar Yunis. He currently resides in England and works for a company that makes rail parts.

References

1966 births
Living people
Pakistan Test cricketers
Pakistan One Day International cricketers
Pakistani cricketers
Pakistan Railways cricketers
House Building Finance Corporation cricketers
Pakistan Automobiles Corporation cricketers
Lahore City cricketers
Lahore City Blues cricketers
Cricketers from Lahore